"Just the Two of Us" is a song written by Bill Withers, William Salter, and Ralph MacDonald, and recorded by Grover Washington Jr. with Withers on vocals. It was released in February 1981 through Elektra Records.

Background
The song originally appeared on Washington's album Winelight (1980). An edited version reached number 2 on the US Billboard Hot 100, staying there for three weeks, behind "Morning Train (9 to 5)" by Sheena Easton and "Bette Davis Eyes" by Kim Carnes. It was Washington's only Top 40 hit. The song won a Grammy Award for Best R&B Song. Bill Withers included the edited version on the 1981 compilation Bill Withers' Greatest Hits and many subsequent greatest hits collections.

The Fender Rhodes electric piano, played in the introduction and throughout, is performed by Richard Tee.

Charts

Weekly charts

Year-end charts

All-time charts

Certifications

Toshinobu Kubota version

"Just the Two of Us" was covered by Japanese singer Toshinobu Kubota as a duet with Caron Wheeler in 1991, for his album Kubojah: Parallel World I. The song was listed as "Just the 2 of Us", featuring a reggae-style beat. In 1995, Kubota re-recorded the song with a more R&B-style beat for his album Sunshine, Moonlight. In 1996, he released the song as the second single from the album. The song charted at number 30 on the Oricon Weekly Singles chart and remained on the charts for five weeks. It was included in the setlist during the Oyeees! Tour. During the tour, Joi Cardwell, who sang backing vocals during the tour, performed the song as a duet with Kubota. In 2007, Double performed the song on the MTV Japan Icons Special; during the performance, Kubota walked onto the stage to complete the song with her. In 2012, Kubota performed the song with Japanese singer Yuri, who was also a background vocalist during his "Party Ain't A Party Tour". The performance was included on his concert DVD "Party Ain't A Party", which was released in May 2012.

Music video
In 1996, Toshi Kubota and Caron Wheeler shot a music video for the song. The video is set at night, at a party in Kubota's apartment. Wheeler watches the party from the fire escape of the next apartment building. The single version was used for the audio format of the video. There are also shots of other musicians playing their instruments during the party, a group of elderly men playing cards outside the apartment on the sidewalk, and a couple dancing in another room of the apartment.

Formats and track listing
CD single
"Just the Two of Us" (Butcher Bros. LP remix) (duet with Caron Wheeler)

Maxi single
"Just the Two of Us" (Butcher Bros. LP remix)
"Just the Two of Us" (Smooth R&B mix)
"Just the Two of Us" (So So Def remix)
"Just the Two of Us" (club mix radio edit)
"Just the Two of Us" (Street mix) (featuring Fat Man Scoop and E. Bros.)

Other cover versions
Bill Cosby did a parody version, "Just the Slew of Us", as the theme music for his movie Bill Cosby: Himself. Ralph MacDonald was the writer/producer.
In 1992, the New York City R&B vocal trio Around the Way sampled the song in "Really Into You". They reached No. 89 on the U.S. Billboard Hot 100 in the fall of that year.
Between 1995-1996, the rapper Don't Try To Xerox (DTTX) sampled "Just the Two of Us" for their song "Tha 2 Of Us", featuring Christopher Williams singing its chorus. The song was part of 1996 Bulletproof film's soundtrack and it is played on ending (casting list) of the film.
Tiro de Gracia sampled "Just the Two of Us" for their song "El Juego Verdadero", off their 1997 Ser humano!! album.
Will Smith released a single in 1997 which samples and incorporates lyrics from the original. Instead of love between a couple, "Just the Two of Us" focuses on the relationship between a father and son. Smith originally wrote a children's book with the same title and lyrics. For his album, he performed it in rap form.
Anal Cunt jokingly performed the song as a duet between singer Seth Putnam and Hillary Logee on their 1997 album I Like It When You Die. It features dissonant out of key keyboard noodling and mocking vocals from Putnam. The writers of the song are credited as "Some Fucking Retard" in the CD booklet.
Dr. Evil parodied the Will Smith version in the Mike Myers James Bond parody film Austin Powers: The Spy Who Shagged Me.
Adult Swim's online show entitled FishCenter Live made a parody of the song entitled "Just the Ten of Us" about the fish.
Matt Dusk and Margaret released a single to promote their collaborative jazz album Just the Two of Us.
Eminem sampled the song on 97’ Bonnie & Clyde off of his debut major label album The Slim Shady LP.
Johnny Mathis covered the song on his 2008 album, A Night to Remember.
Fanfare Ciocărlia's cover of the song was played over the end of the final scene and the beginning of the credits of Borat Subsequent Moviefilm.
Raphael Saadiq covered the song on the Disney Channel series Moon Girl and Devil Dinosaur in the episode "Skip This Ad...olescence".

Appearances in media
In 2020, "Just the Two of Us" started trending on TikTok, which prompted Salters' granddaughter, Jada Salter, to upload a video to the platform commemorating his work. The song appeared in the opening sequence of the 2022 film Hotel Transylvania: Transformania. It has appeared in numerous TV commercials.

References

External links
[ AllMusic Guide link]
 

1980 songs
1981 singles
1996 singles
2015 singles
Bill Withers songs
Male vocal duets
Songs written by Bill Withers
Toshinobu Kubota songs
Songs written by Ralph MacDonald
Elektra Records singles
Margaret (singer) songs
Magic Records singles
Sony Music Entertainment Japan singles
Music videos directed by David Dobkin